Neptis pryeri is a butterfly of the family Nymphalidae. It is found in China, North Asia, Korea and Japan.

The length of the fore-wings is 21–30 mm. Adults are on wing from June to August.

The larvae feed on Spiraea morrisonicola and Spiraea japonica.

Subspecies
There are five recognised subspecies:
Neptis pryeri pryeri
Neptis pryeri koreana (Korea)
Neptis pryeri arboretorum (China)
Neptis pryeri jucundita (Taiwan)
Neptis pryeri oberthueri (Western China)

References

External links
Nymphalidae of Asian Russia

pryeri
Butterflies described in 1871